AMA Superbike is a racing game developed and published by Motorsims for Microsoft Windows in 1999. It is a video game based on the AMA Superbike Championship.

Reception

The game received mixed reviews according to the review aggregation website GameRankings.

References

External links
 

1999 video games
AMA Superbike Championship
Racing video games
Video games developed in the United States
Windows games
Windows-only games